{ "type": "ExternalData", "service": "page", "title": "Western Australian region - Pilbara.map" }

The Pilbara is a large, dry, thinly populated region in the north of Western Australia. It is known for its Aboriginal peoples; its ancient landscapes; the red earth; and its vast mineral deposits, in particular iron ore. It is also a global biodiversity hotspot for subterranean fauna.

Definitions of the Pilbara region

At least two important but differing definitions of "the Pilbara" region exist. Administratively it is one of the nine regions of Western Australia defined by the Regional Development Commissions Act 1993; the term also refers to the Pilbara shrublands bioregion (which differs in extent) under the Interim Biogeographic Regionalisation for Australia (IBRA).

General

It contains some of Earth's oldest rock formations, and includes landscapes of coastal plains and mountain ranges with cliffs and gorges. The major settlements of the region are Port Hedland, Karratha and Newman. The three main ports in this region are Port Hedland, Dampier and Port Walcott.

The area is known for its petroleum, natural gas and iron ore deposits, which contribute significantly to Australia's economy. Other than mining, pastoral activities as well as fishing and tourism are the main industries.

Urban centres and localities

Local government 
The Pilbara region, under the Pilbara Development Commission, contains four local government areas:

Ashburton – Shire of Ashburton
East Pilbara – Shire of East Pilbara
Karratha – City of Karratha
Port Hedland – Town of Port Hedland

Etymology
The Pilbara Aboriginal Language Centre Wangka Maya says that the name for the Pilbara region derives from the Aboriginal word bilybara, meaning "dry" in the Nyamal and Banyjima languages.

Alternatively, the Western Australia Gas Industry claims that the region takes its name from pilbarra, an Aboriginal word for the mullet that is available in local waters. The Pilbara Creek (originally spelt "Pilbarra") is a tributary of the Yule River, a significant river in the region. Sea mullet and barramundi can still be caught in the Yule River today. Pilbara Goldfield, discovered in 1885, was named after the creek, and the name later became associated with the region.

History

Radiocarbon dating estimates in evidence show that rock art and standing stones in the world heritage-listed Murujuga Cultural Landscape in Dampier Archipelago, Australia's earliest known stone structures, believably dating from 6046 to 5338 BC, are of contextualization by thousands of years of unique cultural traditions and folklore. These sites have lived up as part of survival in present times.

The first European to explore the area was Francis Thomas Gregory in 1861. Within two years, European settlers had begun arriving. The region was regarded as part of the North West at first – a larger area that included the modern Kimberley and Gascoyne regions.

Settlements along the coast at Tien Tsin Harbour (later Cossack), Roebourne and Condon (officially Shellborough; later abandoned) were established over ensuing decades, mainly as centres of the rangeland livestock (grazing/pastoral) industry or pearling ports. However, as natural mother of pearl beds around Cossack were fished out, the pearling fleet began to move northward, and by 1883 it was based at Broome, in the Kimberley region. From , pastoralism went into decline with the growth of other, more productive agricultural areas of the state.

Mining in the region started on 1 October 1888, when the Pilbara Goldfield was officially declared – named after a local creek, the goldfield would later give its name to the region as a whole. It was later divided into the Nullagine Goldfield and Marble Bar Goldfield. However, gold mining began to decline in the Pilbara in the mid-1890s, after alluvial ore had been exhausted. In 1937, mining of asbestos commenced at Wittenoom Gorge. While the presence of abundant iron ore had been known for about a century, it was not until the 1960s and the discovery of high-grade ore in the Hamersley Ranges that the area became pivotal to the state's economy, and towns built to accommodate mining and allied services boomed.

In the 1950s, three British nuclear weapons tests were carried out in the Montebello Islands, 130 km (81 mi) off the Pilbara coast.

Aboriginal peoples

Prehistory
The Aboriginal population of the Pilbara considerably predates, by 30–40,000 years, the European colonisation of the region. Archaeological evidence indicates that people were living in the Pilbara even during the harsh climatic conditions of the Last Glacial Maximum. The early history of the first peoples is held within an oral tradition, archeological evidence and petroglyphs. Near the town of Dampier is a peninsula known as Murujuga, which contains a large collection of world heritage listed petroglyphs, dating back thousands of years. Rock art in the Pilbara appears to have been primarily etched into the hard rock surfaces, compared to predominantly paintings on the softer sandstone in the Kimberley. This does not preclude that painting was and is not performed in the Pilbara.

20th century
Working conditions in the pearling and pastoral industries for Aboriginal people in the Pilbara region around 1900 have been described as slavery, with no wages paid, kidnapping as well as severe and cruel punishments for misbehaviour and absconding all common practices. Some incidents, such as the Bendu Atrocity of 1897, attracted international condemnation. The first strike by Indigenous people in Australia took place in 1946 in the Pilbara, known as the Pilbara strike or Pilbara Aboriginal strike, when Aboriginal pastoral workers walked off the stations in protest at low pay and bad working conditions, a strike that lasted for over three years.

Family clans in the Pilbara who were supported by mining prospector, Don McLeod, developed skills for mining and the concentration of rare metals. For a short period money accumulated, which according to Aboriginal law was to be used for traditional ways. Eventually the funds were used to establish an independent Aboriginal-controlled school. The concept has expanded into a movement with around 20 similar schools established in northern Western Australia by the mid 1990s. Jan Richardson, wife of Victorian Aboriginal activist Stan Davey, wrote a biography of McLeod as a doctoral thesis.

21st century
In 2006, it was estimated that 15% of the population of the Pilbara identify as Aboriginal and/or Torres Strait Islander people, approximately 6,000 people.

Many Pilbara communities face the many complex effects of colonisation, and lack adequate access to housing, health and education. A 1971 survey of 1,000 Aboriginal people conducted by Pat McPherson found that most had one or more serious diseases. At the McClelland Royal Commission into British nuclear testing, Aboriginals from the Pilbara provided evidence regarding the explosion on the Montebello Islands.

Aboriginal communities are sited over a number of different places. Many have poor infrastructure, and relations between police and Aboriginal people are often tense.

Location and description

Under the Regional Development Commissions Act Pilbara is situated south of the Kimberley, and is made up of the local government areas of Shire of Ashburton, Shire of East Pilbara, City of Karratha and Town of Port Hedland.

The Pilbara region covers an area of 507,896 km2 (193,826 mi2) (including offshore islands), roughly the combined land area of the US States of California and Indiana.  It has a population of more than 45,000, most of whom live in the western third of the region, in towns such as Port Hedland, Karratha, Wickham, Newman and Marble Bar.  A substantial number of people also work in the region on a fly-in/fly-out basis.
There are approximately 10 major/medium population centres and more than 25 smaller ones

The Pilbara consists of three distinct geographic areas.  The western third is the Roebourne coastal sandplain, which supports most of the region's population in towns and much of its industry and commerce.  The eastern third is almost entirely desert, and is sparsely populated by a small number of Aboriginal peoples. These are separated by the inland uplands of the Pilbara Craton, including the predominant Hamersley Range which has a considerable number of mining towns, the Chichester Range and others. These uplands have a number of gorges and other natural attractions.

The Pilbara contains some of the world's oldest surface rocks, including the ancient fossilised remains known as stromatolites and rocks such as granites that are more than three billion years old. In 2007, some of the oldest evidence of life on Earth was found in 3.4 billion-year-old sandstones at Strelley Pool, which preserve fossils of sulfur-processing bacteria. The mineralized spheres, which were found on an ancient beach and have a cell-like morphology, were chemically analysed, revealing that they used sulfur for fuel.

Climate

The climate of the Pilbara is arid and tropical. It experiences high temperatures and low irregular rainfall that follows the summer cyclones.

The Pilbara town of Marble Bar set a world record of most consecutive days of maximum temperatures of 100 degrees Fahrenheit (37.8 degrees Celsius) or more, during a period of 160 such days from 31 October 1923 to 7 April 1924.

Almost all of the Pilbara's rainfall occurs between December and May, usually with occasional heavy downpours in thunderstorms or tropical cyclones. The period from June to November is usually completely rainless, with warm to very hot and sunny conditions. Like most of the north coast of Australia, the coastal areas of the Pilbara experience occasional tropical cyclones. The frequency of cyclones crossing the Pilbara coast is about 7 every 10 years. Due to the low population density in the Pilbara region, cyclones rarely cause large scale destruction or loss of life.

Economy
The Pilbara's economy is dominated by mining exports and petroleum export industries.

During the 1970s the area was known for union militancy with many strikes and some mines operating as fully unionised 'closed shops.' This was challenged by employers from the mid-1980s onwards and the region now has a very low level of union membership compared to other parts of Australia.

Iron ore

Most of Australia's iron ore is mined in the Pilbara, with mines mostly centred around Tom Price and Newman. The iron ore industry employs 9,000 people from the Pilbara area.

Iron ore deposits were first discovered by prospector Stan Hilditch, who in 1957 found a large iron ore deposit in the southern Ophthalmia Range, at what was to become the Mount Whaleback mine.

In the 1960s, it was reportedly called "one of the most massive ore bodies in the world" by Thomas Price, then vice president of US-based steel company Kaiser Steel. Geoscience Australia calculated that the country's "economic demonstrated resources" of iron amounted to 24 gigatonnes, or 24 billion tonnes. According to the Australian Bureau of Agricultural and Resource Economics, that resource is being used up at a rate of 324 million tonnes a year, with rates expected to increase over coming years. Experts Gavin Mudd (Monash University) and Jonathon Law (Commonwealth Scientific and Industrial Research Organisation) expect it to be gone within 30 to 50 years (Mudd) and 56 years (Law).

, active iron ore mines in the Pilbara are:
 BC Iron
 Iron Valley mine
 BHP
 Area C mine
 Jimblebar mine
 Mount Whaleback mine
 Orebodies 18, 23 and 25 mine
 Yandi mine
 Yarrie mine
 Fortescue Metals Group
 Christmas Creek mine
 Cloud Break mine
 Rio Tinto
 Brockman mine
 Brockman 4 mine
 Channar mine
 Eastern Range mine
 Hope Downs mine
 Marandoo mine
 Mesa A mine
 Mesa J mine
 Mount Tom Price mine
 Nammuldi mine
 Paraburdoo mine
 West Angelas mine
 Yandicoogina mine
 Atlas Iron
 Pardoo mine
 Moly Mines
 Spinifex Ridge (molybdenum, copper, iron ore)

Liquified natural gas
A significant part of Pilbara's economy is based on liquified natural gas (LNG) through the North West Shelf Venture and Pluto LNG plant, both operated by Woodside.

Agriculture

The region also has a number of cattle-grazing stations, and a substantial tourist sector, with popular natural attractions including the Karijini and Millstream-Chichester national parks and the Dampier Archipelago.

Transport

The first railway in the Pilbara region was the narrow-gauge Marble Bar Railway between Port Hedland and Marble Bar. The Marble Bar Railway opened in July 1911 and closed in October 1951. The Roebourne-Cossack Tramway opened in 1897 and many industrial railways have been built to serve the mines.

Five heavy-duty railways are associated with the various iron-ore mines. They are all standard gauge and built to the heaviest North American standards. Rio Tinto runs driverless trains on its railways.

Ports
The ports of the Pilbara are:

 Port Hedland
 Nelson Point and Finucane Island (operated by BHP)
 Herb Elliott Port (operated by the Fortescue Metals Group)
 Dampier (operated by Rio Tinto)
 Cape Lambert (operated by Rio Tinto)
 Anketell Port (under development)

Ecology

Terrestrial

The dominant flora of the Pilbara is acacia trees and shrubs and drought-resistant Triodia spinifex grasses. Several species of acacia (wattle) trees are endemic to the Pilbara and are the focus of conservation programs, along with wildflowers and other local specialities.

The Pilbara is home to a wide variety of endemic species adapted to this tough environment. There is a high diversity of invertebrates, including hundreds of species of subterranean fauna (both stygofauna and troglofauna), which are microscopic invertebrates that live in caves, vugs or groundwater aquifers of the region, and terrestrial fauna (see short-range endemic invertebrates). The Pilbara olive python, the western pebble-mound mouse, and the Pilbara ningaui of the Hamersley Range are among the many species of animals within the fragile ecosystems of this desert ecoregion. Birds include the Australian hobby, nankeen kestrel, spotted harrier, mulga parrot and budgerigars.

Wildlife has been damaged by the extraction of iron, natural gas and asbestos, but the protection of culturally and environmentally sensitive areas of the Pilbara is now enhanced by the delineation of several protected areas, including the Millstream-Chichester and the Karijini National Parks.

Freshwater

The western Pilbara is part of the Pilbara freshwater ecoregion, also known as the Pilbara-Gascoyne or Indian Ocean drainage basin. The freshwater region is characterized by intermittent rivers which form deep gorges, and brackish-water caves that host endemic species. The region includes the drainages of the Murchison, Gascoyne, Ashburton, Fortescue, and De Grey rivers. The Great Sandy Desert, which covers the eastern Pilbara, has little freshwater habitat.

See also 

 Banded iron formation (BIF)
 North West Australia
 Pilbara Coast
 Pilbara historical timeline
 Pilbara newspapers
 Pilbara Railways
 Stromatolite

References

Further reading

Sharp, Janet, and Nicholas Thieberger. (1992). Aboriginal languages of the Pilbara Region: Bilybara. Wangka Maya Pilbara Aboriginal Language Centre, Port Hedland, WA.

External links

 Pilbara Development Commission
 NASA-Macquarie University Pilbara Education Project
 Olive Python captive breeding program
 Wattles of the Pilbara
 Yamatji Marlpa Barna Baba Maaja Aboriginal Corporation , the Native Title Representative Body incorporating the Pilbara Native Title Service

 
Drainage basins of Australia
IBRA regions